Zig Zags is a L.A. based heavy metal/punk rock trio. The band consists of singer/guitarist Jed Maheu, drummer Dane Arnold and bassist Sean Hoffman. Clash has described their music as a "Venn diagram connecting Black Sabbath, Black Flag and Motörhead".

History
Singer Jed Maheu and drummer Bobby Martin began writing music together in 2010. The band is not named for the rolling paper company but is instead named for a slang term for cheap canvas shoes which Maheu and Martin were both wearing at the time. Both Maheu and Martin were originally guitarists but Martin quickly moved to drums and the band played a few shows as a duo. 

Patrick McCarthy, a local fan, soon joined as bassist. The band's first release was a 7 inch entitled Monster Wizard on Tubesteak Tuesday. Four other singles soon followed and in 2012 the band recorded a cover of Betty Davis' "If I'm in Luck I Might Get Picked Up" with Iggy Pop.

Their first album, simply entitled Zig Zags, was recorded and mixed by Ty Segall with a debut single of "Brainded Warrior" released in June 2014. 

By 2016, both Martin and McCarthy were replaced by drummer Dane Arnold and bassist Caleb Miller. When Miller left the band asked their longtime recording engineer, Sean Hoffman, to step in.

In 2019, the band released their fourth album and first release on RidingEasy Records, They’ll Never Take Us Alive. The debut single, "Punk Fucking Metal", was released in February 2019.

Discography
Zig Zags (2014, In the Red Records)
Slime EP (2015, Famous Class)
Running Out of Red (2016, In the Red Records)
They’ll Never Take Us Alive (2019, RidingEasy Records)
L.A. to Pedro EP split with Mike Watt and the Secondmen (2020, Nomad Eel Records)

References

External links
Zig Zags on Bandcamp
Interview with Zig Zags By Alxis Ratkevich on Razorcake

Punk rock groups from California
Heavy metal musical groups from California
Musical groups from Los Angeles
Musical groups established in 2010
American musical trios
2010 establishments in California